Base Realignment and Closure (BRAC) is a process by a United States federal government commission to increase United States Department of Defense efficiency by coordinating the realignment and closure of military installations following the end of the Cold War.  More than 350 installations have been closed in five BRAC rounds: 1988, 1991, 1993, 1995, and 2005. These five BRAC rounds constitute a combined savings of $12 billion annually.

Background
The Federal Property and Administrative Services Act of 1949, passed after the 1947 reorganization of the National Military Establishment, reduced the number of US military bases, forts, posts, and stations. The subsequent 1950s buildup for the Cold War (e.g., during the Korean War) resulted in large numbers of new installations, such as the of Permanent System radar stations and Semi Automatic Ground Environment (SAGE) control centers. By 1959, plans for even larger numbers of Cold War installations were canceled (e.g., DoD's June 19, 1959, Continental Air Defense Program reduced the number of Super Combat Center underground nuclear bunkers to 7) and in 1958, US Intercontinental Ballistic Missiles (ICBMs) began to replace Strategic Air Command bombers. From 1960–1964, the Eisenhower and Kennedy Administrations closed 574 U.S. military bases around the world, particularly after President John F. Kennedy was briefed after his inauguration that the missile gap was not a concern.

1961 closures On March 28, 1961 President Kennedy announced the closure of 73 military establishments.

1964 closures  "In December 1963, Secretary McNamara announced the closure of twenty-six DOD installations or activities in the CONUS".

1965 closures  Secretary of Defense Robert McNamara announced 95 base closures/realignments in November 1964:  80 in the United States (33 states & DC) and 15 overseas. Closures included the Portsmouth Navy Yard, the Brooklyn Navy Yard, the Brooklyn Army Terminal, the Springfield Armory, six bomber bases, and 15 Air Defense Command radar stations—a realignment transferred Highlands Air Force Station to the adjacent Highlands Army Air Defense Site.

1968 Project 693 Project 693 was established by Defense Secretary Clark Clifford during the Vietnam War for reducing programs and personnel, and the project also closed several military installations.

1969 realignments The DoD realigned 307 military bases beginning with an announcement in October 1969.

 1973 closures 224 closures were announced in 1973.

1974 Project Concise Project Concise eliminated most of the Project Nike missile locations which generally each had two sites, a radar station on an elevated landform for guidance and command/control, and a launch area that had launch rails and stored missiles and warheads. A 1976 follow-on program to Concise closed additional installations.

1983 Grace Commission The Grace Commission was President Ronald Reagan's "Private Sector Survey" on cost control that concluded that "savings could be made in the military base structure" and recommended establishing an independent commission to study the issue. Public Law 100–526 endorsed the review in October 1988 and authorized the "special commission to recommend base realignments and closures" to the Secretary of Defense and provided relief from NEPA provisions that had hindered the base closure process.

1988 Carlucci Commission On 3 May 1988 the Carlucci Commission was chartered by Secretary of Defense Frank C. Carlucci, which in December 1988 recommended to close five Air Force bases: Chanute Air Force Base in Illinois, George Air Force Base, Mather Air Force Base and Norton Air Force Base in California, and Pease Air Force Base in New Hampshire.

Law
The Defense Base Realignment and Closure Act of 1990 provided "the basic framework for the transfer and disposal of military installations closed during the base realignment and closure (BRAC) process".  The process was created in 1988 to reduce pork barrel politics with members of Congress that arise when facilities face activity reductions.

The most recent process began May 13, 2005, when Secretary of Defense Donald Rumsfeld forwarded his recommendations for realignments and closures to the Base Realignment and Closure (BRAC) Commission.  The BRAC is an independent nine-member panel appointed by the President. This panel evaluated the list by taking testimony from interested parties and paying visits to affected bases. The BRAC Commission had the opportunity to add bases to the list, and did so in a July 19, 2005 hearing. The Commission met its deadline of September 2005 to provide the evaluated list to the President, who approved the list with the condition that the list could only be approved or disapproved in its entirety. On November 7, 2005 the approved list was then given to Congress which then had the opportunity to disapprove the entire list within 45 days by enacting a resolution of disapproval.  This did not happen and the BRAC Commission's recommendations became final.

Commissions

1988
The 1988 Base Realignment and Closure Commission included:

Alabama Army Ammunition Plant
Army Materials Technology Laboratory
Army Reserve Center Gaithersburg
Bennett Army National Guard Facility
Cameron Station
Cape St. George
Chanute Air Force Base
Coosa River Storage Annex
Defense Mapping Agency site Herndon, Virginia
Former Nike Site at the Aberdeen Proving Ground
Fort Bliss (Realign)
Fort Des Moines
Fort Detrick (Realign)
Fort Dix (Realign as Joint Base McGuire-Dix-Lakehurst)
Fort Douglas
Fort Holabird 
Fort Meade (Realign)
Fort Monmouth 
Fort Sheridan
Fort Wingate Ammunition Storage Depot
Fort Wingate
George Air Force Base
Hamilton Army Airfield
Indiana Army Ammunition Plant
Irwin Support Detachment Annex
Jefferson Proving Ground
Kapalama Military Reservation Phase III
Lexington Army Depot
Lexington-Bluegrass Army Depot
Mather Air Force Base 
Navajo Depot Activity (Turned over to the Arizona Army National Guard)
Naval Hospital Philadelphia
Naval Reserve Center Coconut Grove
Naval Station Galveston
Naval Station Lake Charles
Naval Station New York
Naval Station Puget Sound
Naval Station San Francisco (Realign)
New Orleans Military Ocean Terminal
Nike Washington-Baltimore
Norton Air Force Base
Pease Air Force Base (Realign as Pease Air National Guard Base)
Pontiac Storage Facility
Presidio of San Francisco
Pueblo Army Depot (Realign)
Salton Sea Test Base
St. Louis Area Support Center Wherry housing
Tacony Warehouse
Umatilla Army Depot (Realign)

1990
In 1990, the Navy considered cutting 34 military installations.

1991
The 1991 Base Realignment and Closure Commission included:

 Beale Air Force Base (Realign)
 Bergstrom Air Force Base 
 Carswell Air Force Base (Turned over to the United States Navy Reserve and realign as Naval Air Station Joint Reserve Base Fort Worth)
 Castle Air Force Base
 Eaker Air Force Base
 England Air Force Base
 Fleet Combat Direction Systems Support Activity San Diego (Realign)
 Fort Benjamin Harrison
 Fort Chaffee (Turned over to the Arkansas Army National Guard)
 Fort Devens (Turned over to United States Army Reserve realign as Devens Reserve Forces Training Area) 
 Fort Ord
 Fort Rucker (Realigned)
 Grissom Air Force Base (Realign as Grissom Air Reserve Base)
 Hunters Point Annex
 Integrated Combat Systems Test Facility San Diego
 Letterman Army Institute of Research (Disestablish)
 Loring Air Force Base
 Lowry Air Force Base
 Marine Corps Air Station Tustin
 Myrtle Beach Air Force Base
 Naval Air Station Chase Field
 Naval Air Station Moffett Field
 Naval Air Warfare Center Warminster
 Naval Electronic Systems Engineering Center San Diego
 Naval Electronic Systems Engineering Center Vallejo
 Naval Electronic Systems Engineering Center
 Naval Space Systems Activity Los Angeles
 Naval Station Long Beach
 Naval Station Philadelphia
 Naval Station Puget Sound
 Naval Air Weapons Station China Lake (Realign)
 Naval Air Station Point Mugu 
 Philadelphia Naval Yard
 Presidio of Monterey
 Richards-Gebaur Air Force Base
 Rickenbacker Air Force Base (Portion realigned as Rickenbacker Air National Guard Base)
 Sacramento Army Depot
 Williams Air Force Base
 Wurtsmith Air Force Base

1993
The 1993 Base Realignment and Closure Commission included:

 Anniston Army Depot (Realign)
 Camp Evans
 Fort Wingate
 Griffiss Air Force Base
 Homestead Air Force Base (Realign as Homestead Air Reserve Base)
 K.I. Sawyer Air Force Base
 March Air Force Base (Realign as March Air Reserve Base)
 Mare Island Naval Shipyard
 Marine Corps Air Station El Toro
 Naval Air Station Agana
 Naval Air Station Alameda
 Naval Air Station Barbers Point
 Naval Air Station Cecil Field
 Naval Air Station Dallas (Realign as Grand Prairie Armed Forces Reserve Complex)
 Naval Air Station Glenview
 Naval Air Warfare Center Trenton
 Naval Aviation Depot Alameda
 Naval Aviation Depot Norfolk
 Naval Aviation Depot Pensacola
 Naval Electronic Systems Engineering Center, Saint Inigoes
 Naval Hospital Charleston
 Naval Hospital Oakland
 Naval Hospital Orlando
 Naval Reserve Center Gadsden
 Naval Reserve Center Montgomery
 Naval Station Argentia
 Naval Station Charleston
 Naval Station Mobile
 Naval Station Staten Island
 Naval Station Treasure Island
 Naval Supply Center, Oakland
 Naval Training Center Orlando
 Naval Training Center San Diego
 Newark Air Force Base
 O'Hare Air Reserve Station
 Plattsburgh Air Force Base
 Vint Hill Farms Station
 Williams Air Force Base

1995
The 1995 Base Realignment and Closure Commission included:

 Bergstrom Air Force Base
 Camp Bonneville
 Castle Air Force Base
 Fitzsimons Army Medical Center
 Fort Chaffee (Turned over to the Arkansas National Guard)
 Fort Greely (Realign)
 Fort Indiantown Gap (Turned over to the Pennsylvania National Guard)
 Fort McClellan
 Fort Pickett (Turned over to the Virginia National Guard)
 Fort Ritchie
 Kelly Air Force Base (realigned as Kelly Field)
 Letterkenny Army Depot
 McClellan Air Force Base
 Military Ocean Terminal at Bayonne
 Naval Air Facility Adak
 Naval Air Station South Weymouth
 Naval Air Warfare Center Aircraft Division, Warminster
 Naval Air Warfare Center, Aircraft Division, Indianapolis
 Naval Reserve Center Fayetteville
 Naval Reserve Center Fort Smith
 Naval Reserve Center Huntsville
 Naval Shipyard, Long Beach
 Naval Supply Center, Oakland
 Naval Surface Warfare Center Crane Division
 Naval Surface Warfare Center Dahlgren Division
 Oakland Army Base
 Ontario Air National Guard Station
 Red River Army Depot
 Reese Air Force Base
 Roslyn Air National Guard Station
 Savanna Army Depot Activity
 Seneca Army Depot
 Ship Repair Facility, Guam
 Sierra Army Depot (Realign)
 Stratford Army Engine Plant

2005
The Pentagon released its proposed list for the 2005 Base Realignment and Closure Commission on May 13, 2005 (a date given the moniker "BRAC Friday," a pun on Black Friday). After an extensive series of public hearings, analysis of DoD-supplied supporting data, and solicitation of comments from the public, the list of recommendations was revised by the 9-member Defense Base Closure and Realignments Commission in two days of public markups and votes on individual recommendations (the proceedings were broadcast by C-SPAN and are available for review on the network's website). The Commission submitted its revised list to the President on September 8, 2005. The President approved the list and signalled his approval to Congress on September 15. The House of Representatives took up a joint resolution to disapprove the recommendations on October 26, but the resolution failed to pass. The recommendations were thereby enacted. The Secretary of Defense must implement the recommendations no later than September 15, 2011.

Major facilities slated for closure included:
Brooks Air Force Base, Texas, renamed Brooks City-Base after San Antonio assumed control
Defense Finance and Accounting Service, New York (removed from list 2005)
Ellsworth Air Force Base, South Dakota (removed from list August 26, 2005)
Fort Gillem, Georgia
Fort McPherson, Georgia
Fort Monmouth, New Jersey
Fort Monroe, Virginia
Naval Air Station Brunswick, Maine
Naval Air Station Willow Grove Joint Reserve Base, Pennsylvania
Naval Station Ingleside, Texas
Naval Station Pascagoula, Mississippi
Naval Submarine Base New London, Connecticut (removed from list August 24, 2005)
Navy Supply Corps School
Otis Air National Guard Base, Massachusetts (removed from list August 26, 2005)
Portsmouth Naval Shipyard, Kittery, Maine (removed from list August 26, 2005)

Major facilities slated for realignment include:
Army Human Resource Command (HRC), Missouri, moving to the Fort Knox Military Installation in Kentucky
Cannon Air Force Base, New Mexico 
Eielson Air Force Base, Alaska
Elmendorf Air Force Base, Alaska
Fort Belvoir, Virginia
Fort Meade, Maryland
Fort Rucker, Alabama, Aviation Technical Test Center moving to the Redstone Arsenal, Alabama and combining with the Redstone Technical Test Center to form Redstone Test Center
Grand Forks Air Force Base, North Dakota
Naval Air Station Oceana, Virginia (extent contingent on reopening the former Naval Air Station Cecil Field in Florida)
Naval Station Great Lakes, Illinois
Pope Air Force Base, North Carolina (Transferred to U.S. Army as Pope Army Airfield and merged with Fort Bragg)
Rome Laboratory, New York
Walter Reed Army Medical Center, Washington, D.C.

26 bases were re-aligned into 12 joint bases, with each joint base's installation support being led by the Army, the Air Force, or the Navy. An example is Joint Base Lewis–McChord, Washington, combining Fort Lewis and McChord Air Force Base.

2015
The 2005 Commission recommended that Congress authorize another BRAC round in 2015, and then every eight years thereafter. On May 10, 2012, the House Armed Services Committee rejected Pentagon calls for base closures outside of a 2015 round by a 44 to 18 vote.  Defense Secretary Leon Panetta had called for two rounds of base closures, while at the same time arguing that the alternative of the sequester would be a "meat-ax" approach to cuts which would "hollow out" military forces.

The National Defense Authorization Act for Fiscal Year 2014 specifically prohibits authorization of future BRAC rounds.

In May 2014, it was attempted to fund another round of BRAC, although funding was not approved in a vote in May of that year.

In March 2015, the Acting Assistant Secretary of Defense for Energy, Installations and Environment addressed the possibility of a future BRAC, indicating that the DOD, Defense Secretary Ash Carter was requesting authority to conduct another BRAC.

In September 2015, at the tenth anniversary of the end of the most recent BRAC commission report, its former chairman Anthony J. Principi wrote "now is the time to do what’s right for our men and women in uniform. Spending dollars on infrastructure that does not serve their needs is inexcusable."

Appropriations

The following is a chronological timeline of authorizations for U.S. Congressional legislation related to US defense installation realignments and military base closures.

See also

 Joint bases of the United States military
 Loss of Strength Gradient
 Treaty on Conventional Armed Forces in Europe

References

External links

"Collection:  Defense Base Closure and Realignment Commission" at the UNT Digital Library

Base Realignment and Closure Commission
United States defense policymaking
Lists of United States military installations
Installations of the U.S. Department of Defense
Military Superfund sites